The 1942 South Carolina gubernatorial election was held on November 3, 1942, during World War II, to select the Governor of South Carolina. Olin D. Johnston won the Democratic primary and ran without opposition in the general election on account of South Carolina's effective status as a one-party state, winning a second non-consecutive term as Governor of South Carolina.

Democratic primary
The South Carolina Democratic Party held their primary for governor in the summer of 1942. The race was between former Governor Olin D. Johnston and Wyndham Meredith Manning, the third attempt for both candidates. Olin Johnston emerged victorious in a tight race and effectively became the next governor of South Carolina because there was no opposition in the general election.

General election
The general election was held on November 3, 1942 and Olin D. Johnston was elected the next governor of South Carolina without opposition. Being a non-presidential election and few contested races, turnout was much lower than the Democratic primary election.

 

|-
| 
| colspan=5 |Democratic hold
|-

See also
Governor of South Carolina
List of governors of South Carolina
South Carolina gubernatorial elections

References

"Supplemental Report of the Secretary of State to the General Assembly of South Carolina." Reports and Resolutions of South Carolina to the General Assembly of the State of South Carolina. Volume I. Columbia, SC: 1943, p. 11.

External links
SCIway Biography of Governor Olin Dewitt Talmadge Johnston

1942
Gubernatorial
1942 United States gubernatorial elections
November 1942 events